Clarkenia triangulifera is a species of moth of the family Tortricidae. It is found in Pichincha Province, Ecuador.

The wingspan is 23 mm. The ground colour of the forewings is cream, irregularly suffused with cinnamon brownish. The hindwings are cream, in the distal part somewhat tinged with ferruginous. The strigulation (fine streaking) is brownish grey.

Etymology
The species name refers to the markings of the forewings and is derived from Latin triangulum (meaning triangle) and ferro (meaning I carry).

References

Moths described in 2008
Euliini
Moths of South America
Taxa named by Józef Razowski